Bad Attitudes is a 1991 television film written by Caleb Carr and directed by Alan Myerson. The film was originally aired by Fox Network on September 11, 1991.

Plot
The film centers around two hijackers that take over a plane. The problem is: The airplane is not carrying a billionaire as planned, but otherwise is carrying a group of smart children.

Cast
 Jack Evans as Dabney Mitchell/Narrator
 Ethan Embry as Cosmo Coningsby
 Ellen Blain as Jenny
 Eugene Byrd as James
 Meghann Haldeman as Angela
 Ralph Bruneau as Tim Mitchell
 Carlease Burke as Security Guard
 Maryedith Burrell as Katyana
 Richard Gilliland as Jurgen
 Tony Longo as Bruce Ryan

References

External links
 

1990s English-language films